A trinitarian steeple is a 3-point steeple typical of the province of Soule of Basque Country in France. The three points symbolize the Holy Trinity.

The steeple is generally located above the facade, which is flat. For that reason, it is sometimes called steeple-wall.

Villages with a trinitarian steeple building include the following:
 Agnos
 Arrast
 Aussurucq
 Berrogain-Laruns
 Charritte-de-Bas
 Espès-Undurein
 Gotein-Libarrenx
 Idaux-Mendy
 Mauléon (Chapel of the College)
 Moncayolle
 Chapel of the Osquich pass :fr:Col d'Osquich
 Viellenave-de-Navarrenx
 Viodos-Abense-de-Bas

Notes

Basque culture
Church architecture
Christian architecture